is a former Japanese rugby union player who played as a prop.

Career
Takahashi attended Josho Keiko Gakuen High School and Osaka University of Health
and Sport Sciences, where for the latter, he played in its rugby club between 1986 and 1990, winning the Kansai Cup in 1987 and 1989. Since his graduation from university, Takahashi joined Toyota Motors, with which he played for his entire career, winning the All-Japan Rugby Company Championship in 1999 and the East Japan League in 1995, 1998 and 1999, as well, arrived in the All Japan Championship final in 1999.

International career
Takahashi won his first cap during the match against Fiji, in Tokyo, on 4 March 1990. He was also part of the 1991 Rugby World Cup, although he did not play any match in the tournament. Takahashi also played for Japan in the 1995 Rugby World Cup, playing two matches in the tournament. His last cap was against Hong Kong, in Tokyo, on 29 June 1997.

After retirement
As of 8 April 2015, along with fellow former Toyota Motors player and Japanese international Lopeti Oto, Takahashi was named ambassador for the 2019 Rugby World Cup in Japan.

Notes

External links
2019 ALL FOR JAPAN TEAM

1968 births
Living people
Sportspeople from Osaka Prefecture
Japanese rugby union players
Rugby union props
Japan international rugby union players
Toyota Verblitz players